Roland Mayer (born 1947) is emeritus professor of classics at King's College London. He is a specialist in latin literature and Roman culture.

Selected publications

References

External links
https://kcl.academia.edu/RolandMayer

Living people
Academics of King's College London
University of California, Berkeley alumni
Alumni of the University of Cambridge
Academics of Birkbeck, University of London
1947 births